Las Higueras Airport  is an airport serving Río Cuarto, a city in the Córdoba Province of Argentina.

The Rio Cuarto VOR (Ident: TRC) and non-directional beacon (Ident: R) are located on the field.

Airlines and destinations

Accidents and incidents
17 July 1958: An Argentine Air Force Douglas C-47A, tail number T-22, crashed upon takeoff following an engine failure.
5 May 1969: An ANAC Douglas R4D-1, registration LQ-IPC, crashed on landing at the airport, killing all 11 occupants aboard.

See also

List of airports in Argentina
Transport in Argentina

References

External links
OpenStreetMap - Rio Cuarto Airport

Airports in Argentina